North of Logan Airport in Boston, United States, there is a memorial for air force pilot James O. Conway, who died in 1954.

The memorial stone bears this inscription:

First Lt. James O. Conway
Pilot, Air National Guard,
101st Fighter Interceptor Squadron,
2 October 1954.
First Lieutenant James O. Conway gave his life
to protect the Bayswater Street 
neighborhood. Lt. Conway remained at the
controls of his disabled aircraft rather than
abandon his plane and risk the lives of others.
His heroism, courage and personal sacrifice
reflect the highest credit upon himself and the
Massachusetts Air National Guard.

References

Buildings and structures in Boston
Conway, James O.